Conus aristophanes is a species of sea snail, a marine gastropod mollusk in the family Conidae, the cone snails and their allies.

These snails are predatory and venomous. They are capable of "stinging" humans, therefore live ones should be handled carefully or not at all.

Description
The size of the shell varies between 18 mm and 47 mm. The shell is violaceous gray, somewhat clouded with pink-white. The revolving lines are milk-white, interrupted by chestnut short dashes and spots. The interior of the aperture is chocolate, with a central white band. spire is more or less raised, striate or sometimes nearly smooth, with or without tubercles. The body whorl is striate, the striae usually granulous towards the base, and sometimes throughout.

Distribution
This marine species occurs off the Philippines; Papua New Guinea, Tahiti and Fiji; also off Mozambique.

References

 Filmer R.M. (2001). A Catalogue of Nomenclature and Taxonomy in the Living Conidae 1758 – 1998. Backhuys Publishers, Leiden. 388pp.
 Tucker J.K. (2009). Recent cone species database. September 4, 2009 Edition
 Tucker J.K. & Tenorio M.J. (2009) Systematic classification of Recent and fossil conoidean gastropods. Hackenheim: Conchbooks. 296 pp.
  Petit, R. E. (2009). George Brettingham Sowerby, I, II & III: their conchological publications and molluscan taxa. Zootaxa. 2189: 1–218
 Puillandre N., Duda T.F., Meyer C., Olivera B.M. & Bouchet P. (2015). One, four or 100 genera? A new classification of the cone snails. Journal of Molluscan Studies. 81: 1–23

External links
 The Conus Biodiversity website
 

aristophanes
Gastropods described in 1857